Belcher is an English surname of Norman origin. Notable people with the surname include:

Acting
 Charles Belcher (actor) (1872–1943), American film actor
 Laurence Belcher (born 1995), English actor
 Marjorie Celeste Belcher (1919–2020), birth name of Marge Champion, American dancer and actress
 McKinley Belcher III (born 1984), American actor
 Patricia Belcher (born 1954), American film and television actress

Military
 Douglas Walter Belcher (1889–1953), English recipient of the Victoria Cross
 Edward Belcher (1799–1877), British naval officer and explorer
 Ted Belcher (1924–1966), American soldier and recipient of the Medal of Honor
 Thomas Belcher (1834–1898), American soldier and recipient of the Medal of Honor

Music
 Daniel Belcher (fl. 1990s–2010s), American operatic baritone
 Diane Meredith Belcher (born 1960), American concert organist, teacher, and church musician
 Supply Belcher (1751–1836), American composer, singer, and compiler of tune books

Politics
 Andrew Belcher (merchant, born 1706) (1706–1771), American merchant and Governor's Council member in the Province of Massachusetts Bay
 Andrew Belcher (merchant, born 1763) (1763–1841), British North American merchant and politician in Halifax, Nova Scotia
 Benjamin Belcher (1743–1802), British merchant and politician
 Cornell Belcher, American pollster and political strategist
 Helen Belcher (born 1963), British politician
 Hiram Belcher (1790–1857), American politician in Maine
 J. R. Belcher, Canadian diplomat
 Jennifer Belcher (1944–2022), American politician in Washington
 John Belcher (politician) (1905–1964), British politician
 Jonathan Belcher (1682–1757), American merchant, businessman, and politician from colonial Massachusetts
 Jonathan Belcher (jurist) (1710–1776), American-Canadian lawyer and politician 
 Larry Belcher (1947–2008), American politician in Kentucky, spouse of Linda
 Linda H. Belcher (born 1948), American politician in Kentucky, spouse of Larry
 Louis Belcher (born 1939), American mayor of Ann Arbor, Michigan
 Nathan Belcher (1813–1891), American politician in Connecticut
 Page Belcher (1899–1980), American politician in Oklahoma
 Robin Belcher (born 1976), American politician in Ohio
 Taylor G. Belcher (1920–1990), American diplomat who served as ambassador to Cyprus and Peru

Religion
 John Belcher (Methodist preacher) (fl. 1721–1763), Welsh Methodist preacher
 Joseph Belcher (1699–1723), American minister in Dedham, Massachusetts
 Wilfrid Belcher (1891–1963), Anglican bishop

Sports

Australian rules football
 Allan Belcher (1824–1921), Australian rules footballer
 Norman Belcher (1879–1947), Australian rules footballer
 Vic Belcher (1888–1977), Australian rules football player

Baseball
 Kevin Belcher (baseball) (born 1967), American baseball player
 Tim Belcher (born 1961), American baseball player

Basketball
 Cookie Belcher (born 1978), American basketball player
 Earl Belcher (born 1958), American basketball player

Cricket
 Charles Belcher (cricketer) (1872–1938), English cricketer
 Gordon Belcher (1885–1915), English cricketer
 Samuel Belcher (1834–1920), Australian cricketer

Football (gridiron)
 Jovan Belcher (1987–2012), American football player
 Kevin Belcher (center) (1961–2003), American football player
 Kevin Belcher (offensive tackle) (1961–1997), American football player
 Val Belcher (1954–2010), American player of Canadian football

Rugby
 Gary Belcher (born 1962), Australian rugby league footballer
 Liam Belcher (born 1996), Welsh rugby union player

Water sports
 David Belcher (born 1967), Australian rower
 Friederike Belcher (born 1982), German sports sailor
 Lani Belcher (born 1989), British canoeist
 Mathew Belcher (born 1982), Australian sailor

Other
 Alan Belcher (born 1984), American mixed martial arts fighter
 Christopher Belcher (born 1994), American sprint athlete
 Fred Belcher (1887–1957), American racecar driver
 James Belcher (1781–1811), English bare-knuckle boxer
 Jimmy Belcher (born 1932), English footballer
 Kelvin Belcher (1961–2017), American tennis player
 Rod Belcher (1920–2014), American radio play-by-play announcer
 Simon Belcher (born 1973), British racing driver

Other
 Angela Belcher, American biochemist and materials scientist
 Brian Belcher, Canadian social scientist
 Charles Belcher (disambiguation), multiple people
 Sir Charles Frederic Belcher (1876–1970), Australian ornithologist and British colonial jurist
 Clement Horton Belcher (1801–1869), Canadian bookseller and publisher from Halifax, Nova Scotia
 Cynthia Holmes Belcher (1827–1911), American journalist
 Donald D. Belcher (1938–2018), American business executive
 Ernest Belcher (1871–1949), British assistant general manager of the British Empire Exhibition
 George Belcher (1875–1947), English cartoonist, etcher, and painter
 Hilda Belcher (1881–1963), American artist
 Isaac S. Belcher (1825–1898), American attorney and an Associate Justice of the Supreme Court of California
 John Belcher (disambiguation), multiple people
 John Belcher (architect) (1841–1913), English architect and writer
 John E. Belcher, Irish-born Canadian civil engineer and architect
 John Winston Belcher, American physicist
 Margaret Belcher (1936–2016), New Zealand literary scholar
 Marian Belcher (1849–1898), English educator and school administrator
 Marta Belcher, American technology attorney
 Muriel Belcher (1908–1979), English nightclub owner and artist's model
 Ruth Belcher (1901–2000), birth name of Ruth Dyk, American suffragist, psychologist and author
 William Belcher (1860–1926), New Zealand seaman and unionist
 William J. Belcher (1883–1949), New Zealand and Fijian wildlife artist

See also 

 Belcher (disambiguation)
 Belcher family, fictional main characters in the American animated series Bob's Burgers

English-language surnames